Latham Baseball Stadium is a baseball venue located in Greenville, South Carolina, USA.  It is home to the Furman Paladins college baseball team.  The venue opened in 1956 and has a capacity of 2,000 spectators.

Naming

The stadium is named after Tommy Latham and his family.  Latham was an All-Conference baseball player at Furman.  The venue was renamed and dedicated to him and his family in May 2008 prior to a conference game against Davidson, with the park's full name becoming John T. and Gloria Latham Baseball Stadium (John and Gloria Latham are the parents of the Paladin baseball player Tommy).  The Latham family made a contribution of $1 million for the park to be renamed.  Prior to the renaming, the field had been known as Furman Baseball Stadium since its construction in 1956.

Features
In 1997, the field's seating areas were renovated, with 300 permanent stadium seats being added behind home plate.  In 2001, lights were added to the facility, allowing night games to be played for the first time.  The first night game was played on April 13, 2001, against UNC Greensboro.  In 2006, batting cage was added to the facility; it is located down the left field line.  The stadium also features a press box, scoreboard, and expanded dugouts.

See also
 List of NCAA Division I baseball venues

References 

College baseball venues in the United States
Baseball venues in South Carolina
Furman Paladins baseball
Sports venues in Greenville, South Carolina
1956 establishments in South Carolina
Sports venues completed in 1956